Otan or OTAN may refer to:

 NATO, abbreviated OTAN in French, Spanish and some other languages
 Otan, political party of Kazakhstan, formed into Nur Otan in 2006. 
 Otan Ayegbaju, or Otan, a town in Nigeria
 Autan, or Otan, a village in Syria

See also 

 Ōtāne, a town in New Zealand